5-epi-α-Selinene synthase (EC 4.2.3.90, 8a-epi-α-selinene synthase, NP1) is an enzyme with systematic name (2Z,6E)-farnesyl-diphosphate diphosphate-lyase (cyclizing, 5-epi-α-selinene-forming). This enzyme catalyses the following chemical reaction

 (2E,6E)-farnesyl diphosphate  5-epi-α-selinene + diphosphate

This enzyme requires Mg2+.

References

External links 
 

EC 4.2.3